Northamptonshire Police (colloquially known as Northants Police) is the territorial police force responsible for policing the county of Northamptonshire in the East Midlands of England, in the United Kingdom.

The Northampton Police area includes Brackley, Burton Latimer, Corby, Daventry, Desborough, Higham Ferrers, Irthlingborough, Kettering, Northampton, Oundle, Raunds, Rothwell, Rushden, Towcester, Thrapston and Wellingborough across 914 square miles (2,370 km2) with a resident population of 710,000.  It responds to more than one million phone calls a year, with more than 120,000 of these being emergency 999.

History
Prior to the establishment of uniformed police forces in the United Kingdom, each parish had a Parish Constable – a person appointed locally who had responsibility for enforcing the law within their own village.  In villages and towns, a system known as Watch and Ward was employed, where paid Watchmen guarded towns at night.

Northamptonshire Police can trace its earliest roots to 1840 when the Northamptonshire Constabulary and Daventry Constabulary were formed.  The establishment of police forces at that time was based upon principles established by Sir Robert Peel, the Home Secretary in 1822 and founder of modern-day policing in most Westminster-based systems of government.  Known as the Peelian Principles, they describe a philosophy that define an ethical police force and include:
 Every police officer should be issued an identification number, to assure accountability for his actions.
 Whether the police are effective is not measured on the number of arrests, but on the lack of crime.
 Above all else, an effective authority figure knows trust and accountability are paramount.  Hence, Peel's most often quoted principle that "The police are the public and the public are the police".

Upon creation, Northamptonshire Constabulary initially started with seven superintendents and 35 police constables, who worked in a primitive shift system and were paid 12 shillings a week.

In 1930, Northamptonshire Constabulary rolled-out their first motorised vehicles for law enforcement use.  The inventory included two cars and four motorcycles for police officer use.  The vehicles were stationed throughout the county, with one car based in Daventry and the other in Kettering.  The motorcycles were stationed in Northampton, Wellingborough, Oundle and Towcester.

The Northamptonshire Constabulary merged with the borough police forces within Northamptonshire on 1 April 1966 to form Northampton and County Constabulary with an estimated 442 officers and actual strength of 387.

The force was renamed the Northamptonshire Police on 1 January 1975.

Chief constables
The chief constable is the most senior officer within Northamptonshire Police and holds command of the force. The chief constable is accountable to the police and crime commissioner, who appoints chief constables and may dismiss them.

Northamptonshire Police and Crime Commissioner
The Northamptonshire Police and Crime Commissioner (PCC) is an elected official charged with securing efficient and effective policing within the county.  The position replaces the now abolished police authorities.  The PCC is elected for four-year terms.  The first incumbents were elected on 15 November 2012.

The current PCC is Stephen Mold who was elected to office on 5 May 2016 and re-elected in 2021 to a term expiring in May 2024.

The core functions of the PCC is to secure the maintenance of an efficient and effective police force within Northamptonshire, and to hold the Chief Constable to account for the delivery of the police and crime plan.  The PCC is also charged with holding the police fund (from which all policing in the county is financed) and raising the local policing precept from council tax.  Lastly, the PCC is responsible for the appointment, suspension and dismissal of the Chief Constable.

Police and Crime Plan
Shortly after their election to office, the PCC is required to produce a Police and Crime Plan.  The plan must include their objectives for policing, what resources will be provided to the Chief Constable and how performance will be measured.  Both the PCC and the Chief Constable must have regard to the Police and Crime Plan in the exercise of their duties.  The PCC is required to produce an annual report to the public on progress in policing. The Police and Crime Plan 2014-2017 is Northamptonshire Police's foundation document.

Police funding
The PCC is charged with managing the 'police fund', from which all policing is financed. The bulk of funding for the police fund comes from the Home Office in the form of an annual grant (calculated on a proportionate basis by the Home Office to take into account the differences between the 43 forces in England and Wales, which vary significantly in terms of population, geographical size, crime levels and trends), though the PCC has the authority to set a precept on the Council Tax to raise additional funds.  The PCC is responsible for setting the budget for the Force, which includes allocating enough money from the overall policing budget to ensure that they can discharge their own functions effectively.

Facilities
Police officers and staff operate from the Police Force Headquarters at Wootton Hall in Northampton as well an additional six smaller stations based in: Corby, Daventry, Kettering, Northampton, Wellingborough and Weston Favell.

There are also two Justice Centres:

 Criminal Justice Centre (Brackmills) - This is a base for police support staff, officers and also has a custody centre.
 Weekley Wood Justice Centre (Kettering) - This is a base for police support staff, officer and also has a custody centre.
 Weekley Wood is also a joint base for administrative staff of the Northamptonshire Fire and Rescue Service.

Organisation 
The force is led by the chief constable, and is composed of:

 The chief officers and Force Command Team;
 Crime and Justice Command;
 Force Support Departments;
 East Midlands Police Collaboration; and,
 Multi-Force Shared Services.

PEEL inspection
Her Majesty's Inspectorate of Constabulary and Fire & Rescue Services (HMICFRS) conducts a periodic police effectiveness, efficiency and legitimacy (PEEL) inspection of each police service's performance. In its latest PEEL inspection, Northamptonshire Police was rated as follows:

Personnel and ranks
Northamptonshire Police employ around 2,207 people;

 Police Officers: 1,278 (sworn)
 Police Community Support Officers: 97 (un-sworn)
 Police Staff: 832 (un-sworn)

But are also supported by sworn and un-sworn volunteers;

 Special Constables: 193 (sworn)
 Police Support Volunteers: 14 (un-sworn)

Regular members
The term regular member, or "Regular", refers to the more than 1,220 regular police constables who are trained, attested and paid officers of the Force, and include all the ranks from Constable to Chief Constable.  They are responsible for investigating crime, and have the authority to make arrests.  Regulars are responsible for general policing duties and serve in a variety of operational and administrative roles within the Force, including: major crime investigations, emergency response, forensic identification, forensic collision reconstruction, bike patrol, explosives disposal and police dog services.  Also included are administrative roles including corporate services (finance, HR, etc.), policy analysis, public affairs and professional standards.

In law, every member of a police force is a constable whatever their actual rank, in the sense that, despite being a low-ranking or high-ranking officer, all have the same powers of arrest. The basic police powers of arrest and search of an ordinary Constable are identical to those of a superintendent or chief constable; however certain higher ranks are given administrative powers to authorise certain police actions. In England and Wales, these include the powers to:
 authorise the continued detention of up to 24 hours of a person arrested for an offence and brought to a police station (granted to sergeants and above at designated police stations),
 authorise section 18 (1) PACE house searches (granted to inspectors and above), or
 extend the length of prisoner detention to 36 hours (granted to Superintendents).

Some authorities are matters of force or national or force policy, such as authorising the use of spike strips, and authorising the use of safe controlled crashes of pursued vehicles, by trained officers.

In relation to police officers of the territorial police forces of England and Wales, section 30 of the Police Act 1996 states that "a member of a police force shall have all the powers and privileges of a Constable throughout England and Wales and the adjacent United Kingdom waters".  Police officers do not need to be on duty to exercise their powers and can act off duty if circumstances require it (technically placing themselves back on duty).  Officers from the police forces of Scotland and Northern Ireland and non-territorial special police forces have different jurisdictions.

Officers holding ranks up to and including Chief Superintendent who are members of the Criminal Investigation Department (CID) or Special Branch (and certain other units) have the prefix "Detective" before their rank.  Due to the nature of their duties, these officers generally wear plain clothes and so do not wear the corresponding rank insignia; however, they still operate within the same structure as their uniformed counterparts.

Regular member ranks
Like most of the police forces of the United Kingdom, Northamptonshire Police uses a standardised set of ranks that were chosen by Home Secretary Sir Robert Peel in 1829.  The ranks at that time were deliberately chosen so that they did not correspond with military ranking (with the exception of Sergeant), due to fears of a paramilitary force. Northamptonshire Police have a number of chief inspectors and detective chief inspectors as well as three 
chief superintendents.

Special constables
Special constables are volunteer police officers who have exactly the same powers as a regular officer, and (with minor exceptions) wear the same uniform and are issued the same equipment.  Special constables are assigned to Safer Community Teams (SCTs) and work alongside police officers and PCSOs, to tackle crime and anti-social behaviour, and help improve public confidence and satisfaction.  In addition, specials support operations across the Force, carry out plain-clothed patrols, gather intelligence and execute warrants.

Emergency Services Cadets
The Northamptonshire Emergency Services Cadets deliver a combined emergency services curriculum allowing young people to develop skills across their emergency services as well as social and life skills. Their cadet scheme is open to all young people who are aged 13–18 and represent their local communities. NESC are a registered charity supported by Northamptonshire Police, Northamptonshire Fire and Rescue and East Midlands Ambulance Service.

NESC support all the emergency services with operational policing and community engagement. 
The programme is open to all young people regardless of their career ambitions or capabilities.  The programme aims to develop participant skills that will be of benefit to communities and employers.

Police community support officers
A police community support officer (PCSO) is a uniformed civilian member of police support staff. They are non-warranted but are provided a variety of police powers.  PCSO's work within Safer Community Teams composed of PCSO's, regular officers and special constables to undertake high visibility patrolling, tackling anti-social behaviour, dealing with minor offences, gathering criminal intelligence and supporting front-line policing.

Resources

Vehicles 

As of January 2016, Northamptonshire Police use a range of vehicles to perform their duties. Vehicles are used for regular patrols and response, armed response, road crime units, and dog units. They also use motorcycles.

Air support 
Northamptonshire Police do not have their own aircraft as all UK police forces are now supported by the centralised National Police Air Service.

East Midlands Operational Support Service (EMOpSS) 

Northamptonshire was formerly a member of the shared service that works to collaborate and share officers, resources and equipment between Lincolnshire Police and Leicestershire Police.

Tasers 
On 19 August 2019, then chief constable Nick Adderley announced that he will be equipping all front line officers with tasers. After a Police Federation of England and Wales poll found that 94% of officers would like to see more officers armed with tasers. Adderley stated that the deployment would take approximately 18 months and cost the force around £220,000 but he felt that it was justifiable, given the increase in violent attacks against officers.

See also
List of law enforcement agencies in the United Kingdom, Crown Dependencies and British Overseas Territories
Law enforcement in the United Kingdom

References

External links

 Northamptonshire Police at HMICFRS

Police forces of England
Police
1840 establishments in England
North Northamptonshire
Organizations established in 1840
West Northamptonshire District